A Hanukkah stamp is a holiday stamp issued to commemorate Hanukkah. Since 1996, several Hanukkah-themed postage stamps have been issued, often jointly.

Description 
A Hanukkah stamp is a holiday postage stamp issued to commemorate the Jewish holiday Hanukkah.

History

Israel 
The United States Postal Service (USPS) issued a 32-cent Hanukkah stamp in 1996 with a menorah design as a joint issue with Israel Post. A menorah design was also used in 2008 for a forever stamp issued jointly with USPS. In 2012, a stamp sheet commemorating Hanukkah was issued jointly with India Post.

United States 
The United States Postal Service has released several Hanukkah-themed postage stamps.

1996

The United States Postal Service (USPS) issued a 32-cent Hanukkah stamp in 1996 as a joint issue with Israel. This initial printing produced 103.5 million stamps and in 1997 there was a re-issue. It is regarded as the first Jewish stamp issued by the US Postal service and noted by most experts and dealers of these kind of stamps.

Thus, that stamp and the year it was first issued, 1996, was historic, and was part of a turnaround, as explained:
The stamp was reissued in 1999 with a 33-cent denomination, followed in 2001 at 34 cents and 2002 at 37 cents.

2004
In 2004 after 8 years of reissuing the menorah design, the USPS issued a dreidel design for the Hanukkah stamp with a 37-cent denomination. The dreidel design was used through 2008, with changes in denomination to 39 cents in 2006, 41 cents in 2007 and 42 cents in 2008.

2008 
A menorah design was used in 2008 for a forever stamp issued jointly with Israel Post.

2009
The 2009 Hanukkah design features a photograph of a menorah with nine lit candles and a 44-cent denomination. The menorah was designed by Lisa Regan of the Garden Deva Sculpture Company in Tulsa, OK, and photographed by Ira Wexler of Braddock Heights, MD. Garden Deva was commissioned by the U.S. Postal Service to design and fabricate the menorah. After the reveal ceremony in New York City on October 9, the stamp was made available nationwide at all post offices.

2011
In 2011, the Hanukkah stamp was redesigned with the word "Hanukkah" broken into eight boxes, one of which (the second K) is in the shape of a dreidel. The denomination was 44 cents.

2013
In 2013, the USPS issued a revamped Hanukkah menorah design on a brown background as a forever stamp with an effective 46 cent denomination.  The stamp was redesigned and issued in 2016 with a blue background and an effective 47-cent denomination.

References

Stamps
Postage stamps of the United States